Andriy Lemishevsky (born October 1, 1987) is a Ukrainian footballer.

Playing career 
Lemishevsky began his career in 2006 with Iskra-Skirts in the Ukrainian Football Amateur League. In 2007, he signed with FC Podillya Khmelnytskyi of the Ukrainian Second League, where he featured in a total of 28 matches. In 2008, he transferred to FC Dynamo Khmelnytskyi, and played in 23 matches. Lemishevsky had stints with FC Yednist' Plysky, FC Dynamo Khmelnytskyi, and FC Ahrobiznes Volochysk. In 2016, he went overseas to Canada to sign with FC Ukraine United of the Canadian Soccer League. The following season he played with FC Vorkuta.

References 

1987 births
Living people
Footballers from Chernihiv
Ukrainian footballers
FC Podillya Khmelnytskyi players
FC Dynamo Khmelnytskyi players
FC Yednist Plysky players
FC Ukraine United players
FC Continentals players
Canadian Soccer League (1998–present) players
Association football midfielders
FC Ahrobiznes Volochysk players
Ukrainian Second League players